The Kumudavathi river is a minor river that flows to the north west of the city of Bangalore. The river has largely dried up but there are ongoing efforts to rejuvenate it.

Course 
The river originates at Kumbha Thirtha in Shivagange hills and flows for 45 km before its confluence with the Arkavathi river at Thippagondanahalli (T.G.Halli) reservoir. The river basin is spread across 460 Sq. Km and the entire catchment area encompasses 278 villages.

Drying Up and Revival Efforts  
Although water flow in the river had been decreasing, it only got attention in 2007 when the Thippagondanahalli reservoir fed by Kumudvathi River went dry. In February 2013, a large team of volunteers from the Art of Living (AOL) took up a project to rejuvenate the Kumudvathi river by using a scientific methodology. Over the course of the next years, the project built over 439 boulder checks, de-silted over 20 traditional stepwells, constructed 434 recharge wells and 71 water pools, built 45 recharge borewells, planted more than 425,000 saplings, besides spreading awareness to over 75,000 people residing in over 100 villages surrounding the river basin.

References 

Rivers of Karnataka
Geography of Bangalore
Rivers of India